Desmond Christian Simonson (17 April 1926 – 5 April 2004) was a New Zealand rower. At the 1950 British Empire Games in Auckland, Simonson (bow) and Joe Schneider (stroke) won the silver medal in the men's double sculls. They finished with a time of 7:32, 10 seconds behind the winning Australian crew. Both Simonson and Schneider were members of the Aramoho Rowing Club in Whanganui, where they were coached by the former world professional single scull champion, William Webb.

References

1926 births
2004 deaths
New Zealand male rowers
Rowers at the 1950 British Empire Games
Commonwealth Games silver medallists for New Zealand
Commonwealth Games medallists in rowing
Medallists at the 1950 British Empire Games